LattisNet was a family of computer networking hardware and software products built and sold by SynOptics Communications (also rebranded by Western Digital) during the 1980s. Examples were the 1000, 2500 and 3000 series of LattisHub network hubs.
LattisNet was the first implementation of 10 Megabits per second local area networking over unshielded twisted pair wiring in a star topology.

Ethernet variants
During the early 1980s most networks used coaxial cable as the primary form of premises cabling in Ethernet implementations.  In 1985 SynOptics shipped its first hub for fiber optics and shielded twisted pair.  
SynOptics' co-founder, Engineer Ronald V. Schmidt, had experimented with a fiber-optic variant of Ethernet called Fibernet II while working at Xerox PARC, where Ethernet had been invented.
In January 1987 SynOptics announced intentions to manufacture equipment supporting 10 megabits/sec data transfer rates over unshielded twisted pair, telephone wire.

In August 1987 New York based LAN Systems, Inc. completed the equipment testing and praised SynOptics for successfully deploying a 10Mbit/s network that supported workstations up to 330 feet from the wiring closet, because of their careful control of EMI and RFI.
Novell reported that the LattisNet equipment performed better than RG-58U coaxial cable.

This same year HP proposed a study group be formed to look into standardizing Ethernet on telephone wires. SynOptics' investor, Menlo Ventures explained its position on joining the IEEE for standardization.
   
 
In 1990 the IEEE issued an Ethernet over twisted pair standard known for transmitting 10 Mbit/s, or 10BASE-T (802.3i).

Ethernet compatibility
Of  the SynOptics hubs, the 2500 series was only compatible with LattisNet twisted-pair Ethernet; the 1000 and 3000 series featured modules for LattisNet and standard 10BASE-T. In the 1000 series, the 505 modules are LattisNet and the 508 modules are 10BASE-T.

References

External links
  (Advertisement)
 

Ethernet / 10BASE-T / LattisNet discussions
  A method to identify the type of 3000-series modules
 
 
 

Networking hardware
Ethernet